Kenneth Deane may refer to:

 Kenneth Deane (police officer), policeman convicted of criminal negligence
 Kenneth Deane (swimmer) (1921–1997), English swimmer

See also  
 Kenneth Dean (disambiguation)